This is a list of seasons played by Borussia Dortmund in German and European football, from 1911 (the year of the club's first competitive season) to the most recent completed season. Borussia Dortmund were founded on 19 December 1909.

The club has won the German Championship eight times, the German Cup five times and the German Supercup six times. They also won the UEFA Champions League and the Intercontinental Cup in 1997 and the UEFA Cup Winners' Cup in 1966. Borussia Dortmund was the first German club to win a UEFA competition.

This list details the club's achievements in all competitions, and the top scorers for each season.

Seasons

Footnotes

References 
 Borussia Dortmund at Fußballdaten.de (in German)
 BVB-Statistik at Schwatzgelb.de (in German)
 
 

Seasons
Borussia Dortmund
Borussia Dortmund